Pipkov Glacier is the 11 km long in east-northeast to west-southwest direction and 3.2 km wide glacier on the west side of Havre Mountains in northern Alexander Island, Antarctica. The glacier is situated south and southwest of Lennon Glacier, and north of Oselna Glacier. It flows westwards between Kutev Peak and Nicolai Peak on the north, and Simon Peak on the south, and enters Lazarev Bay southeast of Buneva Point and north of Kamhi Point.

The feature is named after the Bulgarian composers Panayot Pipkov (1871-1942) and Lyubomir Pipkov (1904-1974).

Location
British mapping in 1971 and 1991.

Maps
 British Antarctic Territory. Scale 1:200000 topographic map. DOS 610 – W 69 70. Tolworth, UK, 1971
 British Antarctic Territory. Scale 1:250000 topographic map. Sheet SR19-20/5.  APC UK, 1991
 Antarctic Digital Database (ADD). Scale 1:250000 topographic map of Antarctica. Scientific Committee on Antarctic Research (SCAR). Since 1993, regularly upgraded and updated

References
 Bulgarian Antarctic Gazetteer. Antarctic Place-names Commission. (details in Bulgarian, basic data in English)
 Pipkov Glacier. SCAR Composite Gazetteer of Antarctica

External links
 Pipkov Glacier. Copernix satellite image

Glaciers of Alexander Island
Bulgaria and the Antarctic